Our Friend is a 2019 American biographical drama film directed by Gabriela Cowperthwaite and written by Brad Ingelsby, based on Matthew Teague's 2015 Esquire article "The Friend: Love Is Not a Big Enough Word". It stars Jason Segel, Dakota Johnson, and Casey Affleck.

The film had its world premiere under its original title The Friend at the 2019 Toronto International Film Festival on September 6, 2019, and was released on January 22, 2021, by Gravitas Ventures. It was a box-office bomb, only grossing $714,255 on a $10 million budget.

Plot
In the winter of 2013, Matt and Nicole Teague prepare to tell their daughters, Molly and Evie, that Nicole's ovarian cancer is terminal. Outside, their best friend Dane Faucheux keeps the children company.

In a flashback to 2000, Matt, a journalist, and Nicole, a theater performer, live in New Orleans. She introduces Matt to Dane, a friend from college working as a camera operator who dreams of becoming a stand-up comic. The three become close over the years. In 2008, Matt and Nicole reside in Fairhope with their daughters. Matt works as a war correspondent and spends months overseas, putting a strain on the family. Meanwhile, Dane remains in New Orleans working dead-end jobs. On Thanksgiving, Dane, unhappy with his life, decides to backpack at the Grand Canyon without telling anyone where he is going. Another backpacker recognizes his potential suicidal behavior and offers support. Her gesture of kindness, plus an unexpected voicemail from the Teague family, renews Dane's will to live. In 2010, Matt discovers that Nicole had an affair. With Dane's help, they reconcile their relationship. Dane returns home where he works as a manager at a sporting goods store and begins dating a woman named Kat.

In September 2012, Nicole receives her diagnosis and begins to undergo chemotherapy. Recognizing their need for help, Dane offers to stay with them for a few weeks. However, as Nicole's condition worsens, Dane decides to remain with them, taking on many household duties. Kat struggles to understand Dane's loyalty to the Teague family after weeks turn into months, and they break up. On Christmas, Nicole ruptures her abdomen, and Dane is left to watch over the girls. Following her surgery, the doctor reveals to Matt that Nicole's cancer has spread and gives her approximately six months to live. Nicole decides that she does not want to tell their daughters until her quality of life declines significantly.

Nicole prepares a bucket list which Matt and Dane help her accomplish; such as sitting as Grand Marshal of the Mardi Gras parade, swimming in a historic fountain with all of her friends, and writing letters to her daughters for future life events. As 2013 closes and Nicole becomes sicker, they decide to tell their daughters and Dane listens on in sorrow as the girls cry.

By the summer of 2014, Nicole becomes increasingly irritable, hallucinates, and experiences pain. Realizing that Matt is overwhelmed, Dane takes him hiking. Upon their return, Matt realizes that they are no longer equipped to care for Nicole so he calls a hospice nurse, Faith Pruett. Nicole's friends and family visit with her one last time. One night, Faith alerts them of Nicole's slowing heart rate, and they take her to the beach to watch one final sunrise. Returning home, Nicole dies with Matt and Dane at her side.

Following Nicole's funeral, Dane confines himself to his room and grieves alone. Matt writes an article called "The Friend", which he gives to Dane. Dane finally decides to go home after putting his life on hold to live with the Teague family for over fourteen months. Matt embraces Dane, expressing that simply saying "Thank you" isn't enough. In the epilogue, it is revealed that Matt's article won an award in Esquire magazine and that he and his daughters remain in Fairhope. Dane remains close to the Teague family and marries in 2019.

Cast
Casey Affleck as Matthew Teague
Dakota Johnson as Nicole Teague
Jason Segel as Dane Faucheux
Jake Owen as Aaron
Gwendoline Christie as Teresa
Cherry Jones as Faith Pruett
Denée Benton as Charlotte
Isabella Rice as Molly
Violet McGraw as Evie
Marielle Scott as Kat
Ahna O'Reilly as Gale
Azita Ghanizada as Elizabeth
Sampley Barinaga as Kenny

Production
In January 2019, it was announced Casey Affleck, Dakota Johnson, Jason Segel and Jake Owen had been cast in the drama film The Friend, with Gabriela Cowperthwaite directing from a screenplay by Brad Ingelsby, based upon an Esquire article by Matthew Teague. Gwendoline Christie and Cherry Jones were among additional casting announced in February.

Filming began on February 19, 2019, in Fairhope, Alabama.

Release
The film had its world premiere at the 2019 Toronto International Film Festival on September 6, 2019. It also was screened at AFI Fest on November 16, 2019. In January 2020, Roadside Attractions and Gravitas Ventures acquired distribution rights to the film. It was retitled Our Friend, and released on January 22, 2021.

Reception

Critical response 
The site's critics consensus reads: "Our Friends occasionally frustrating approach to dramatizing its fact-based story is often offset by a trio of starring performances led by a never-better Jason Segel." Metacritic assigned the film a weighted average score of 57 out of 100, based on 20 critics, indicating "mixed or average reviews".

Ella Kemp from The Playlist praised the performances stating: "The Friend is successfully anchored by its three leading players... The sensitivity of these performances, particularly from Affleck and Segel, offers a reckoning on sincere friendship and the limits of devotion that remains with the viewer, long after the days of waiting and the years of pain have finally come to an end."

Katey Rich of Vanity Fair said: "It succeeds by sticking closely to the important specifics ... It's a small-scale human story, precious few of which make it to film these days. It's also, if you're in the market for that kind of thing, an extremely effective tearjerker." Conversely, Peter Debruge of Variety wrote: "So much of the unpleasantness has been scrubbed from the picture, until what remains is precisely the kind of dishonest, sanitized no-help-to-anyone TV-movie version of death that inspired Teague to set the record straight in the first place."

Sheila O'Malley, writing for Roger Ebert's film criticism website, gave it a 3 star rating.

References

External links

"The Friend: Love Is Not a Big Enough Word" (Esquire article that served as source for film)

2019 films
2019 biographical drama films
2019 drama films
American biographical drama films
Black Bear Pictures films
Drama films based on actual events
Films about cancer
Films based on newspaper and magazine articles
Films directed by Gabriela Cowperthwaite
Films scored by Rob Simonsen
Films set in Alabama
Films set in New Orleans
Films shot in Alabama
Films with screenplays by Brad Ingelsby
Scott Free Productions films
STX Entertainment films
2010s English-language films
2010s American films
English-language drama films